Utricularia limosa is a terrestrial or subaquatic carnivorous plant that belongs to the genus Utricularia (family Lentibulariaceae). It is native to Southeast Asia (Laos, Malaysia, Thailand and Vietnam), Australia (Northern Territory, Queensland and Western Australia), China and New Guinea.

See also 
 List of Utricularia species

References 

Carnivorous plants of Asia
Carnivorous plants of Australia
Flora of China
Flora of Indo-China
Flora of Malesia
Flora of New Guinea
Flora of Queensland
Flora of the Northern Territory
Eudicots of Western Australia
limosa
Lamiales of Australia